Stephen Lennon  may refer to:

Stephen Lennon, guitarist in The Questions
Stephen Yaxley-Lennon, former leader of the English Defence League
Steven Lennon, Scottish footballer